

Canadian Football News in 1948
The WIFU increased their games from 8 to 12 games per team.

The Hamilton Tigers, formerly of the IRFU joined the ORFU, and the Hamilton Wildcats joined the IRFU on Friday, April 9.

The Regina/Saskatchewan Roughriders and the Calgary Stampeders changed their team colours. The Roughriders adopted green and white and the Stampeders reverted to red and white.

In the Grey Cup game, the Stampeders introduced pageantry with saddle horses and chuck wagons as they defeated the Ottawa Rough Riders 12–7 to win their first Grey Cup.

Regular season

Final regular season standings
Note: GP = Games Played, W = Wins, L = Losses, T = Ties, PF = Points For, PA = Points Against, Pts = Points

Bold text means that they have clinched the playoffs.

Grey Cup playoffs
Note: All dates in 1948

Finals

Calgary won the total-point series by 21–10. The Stampeders will advance to the Grey Cup game.

Hamilton won the total-point series by 39–1. The Tigers will play the Ottawa Rough Riders in the Eastern finals.

Ottawa won the total-point series by 34–28. The Rough Riders will play the Hamilton Tigers in the Eastern finals.

Eastern Finals

The Ottawa Rough Riders will advance to the Grey Cup game.

Playoff bracket

Grey Cup Championship

It was the first Grey Cup win for Calgary after the team became the first (and still only) team to go undefeated in the regular season and playoffs.

1948 Eastern (Interprovincial Rugby Football Union) All-Stars
NOTE: During this time most players played both ways, so the All-Star selections do not distinguish between some offensive and defensive positions.

QB – Bob Paffrath, Ottawa Rough Riders
HB – Howie Turner, Ottawa Rough Riders
HB – Virgil Wagner, Montreal Alouettes
HB – Joe Krol, Toronto Argonauts
E  – Bert Haigh, Ottawa Rough Riders
E  – Ralph Toohy, Montreal Alouettes
FW – Tony Golab, Hamilton Wildcats
C  – Don Loney, Ottawa Rough Riders
G  – Eddie Michaels, Ottawa Rough Riders
G  – Lloyd "Bronco" Reese, Montreal Alouettes
T  – Herb Trawick, Montreal Alouettes
T  – John Wagoner, Ottawa Rough Riders

1948 Ontario Rugby Football Union All-Stars
NOTE: During this time most players played both ways, so the All-Star selections do not distinguish between some offensive and defensive positions.
QB – Frank Filchock, Hamilton Tigers
HB – Jack Harper, Hamilton Tigers
HB – Jack Stewart, Hamilton Tigers
DB – Doug Pyzer, Toronto Beaches-Indians
E  – Verne Picard, Toronto Beaches-Indians
E  – Danny DiFrancisco, Hamilton Tigers
FW – Gerry Walsh, Hamilton Tigers
C  – Jake Gaudaur, Hamilton Tigers
G  – Don McKenzie, Toronto Beaches-Indians
G  – Eddie Remigis, Hamilton Tigers
T  – Pat Santucci, Hamilton Tigers
T  – Lorne Parkin, Toronto Beaches-Indians

1948 Western (Western Interprovincial Football Union) All-Stars
NOTE: During this time most players played both ways, so the All-Star selections do not distinguish between some offensive and defensive positions.
QB – Keith Spaith, Calgary Stampeders
HB – Don Hiney, Winnipeg Blue Bombers
HB – Ken Charlton, Saskatchewan Roughriders
HB – Gabe Patterson, Saskatchewan Roughriders
FB – Paul Rowe, Calgary Stampeders
E  – Johnny Bell, Saskatchewan Roughriders
E  – Woody Strode, Calgary Stampeders
C  – Chuck Anderson, Calgary Stampeders
G – Bud Irving, Winnipeg Blue Bombers
G – Bert Iannone, Calgary Stampeders
G – Dave Tomlinson, Calgary Stampeders
T – Johnny Aguirre, Calgary Stampeders
T – Mike Cassidy, Saskatchewan Roughriders

1948 Canadian Football Awards
 Jeff Russel Memorial Trophy (IRFU MVP) – Eric Chipper (OT), Ottawa Rough Riders
 Jeff Nicklin Memorial Trophy (WIFU MVP) - Keith Spaith (QB), Calgary Stampeders
 Gruen Trophy (IRFU Rookie of the Year) - Keith English (E), Montreal Alouettes
 Imperial Oil Trophy (ORFU MVP) - Frank Filchock - Hamilton Tigers

References

 
Canadian Football League seasons